Stefan Forster (born 14 December 1971 in Würzburg) is a German rower.

References 
 
 

1971 births
Living people
Sportspeople from Würzburg
Olympic rowers of Germany
Rowers at the 1996 Summer Olympics
World Rowing Championships medalists for Germany
German male rowers